Lazar Markovich Lissitzky (– 30 December 1941), better known as El Lissitzky, was a Russian artist, designer, photographer, typographer, polemicist and architect. He was an important figure of the Russian avant-garde, helping develop suprematism with his mentor, Kazimir Malevich, and designing numerous exhibition displays and propaganda works for the Soviet Union. His work greatly influenced the Bauhaus and constructivist movements, and he experimented with production techniques and stylistic devices that would go on to dominate 20th-century graphic design.

Lissitzky's entire career was laced with the belief that the artist could be an agent for change, later summarized with his edict, "" (goal-oriented creation). Lissitzky, of Lithuanian Jewish оrigin, began his career illustrating Yiddish children's books in an effort to promote Jewish culture in Russia. When only 15 he started teaching, a duty he would maintain for most of his life. Over the years, he taught in a variety of positions, schools, and artistic media, spreading and exchanging ideas. He took this ethic with him when he worked with Malevich in heading the suprematist art group UNOVIS, when he developed a variant suprematist series of his own, Proun, and further still in 1921, when he took up a job as the Russian cultural ambassador to Weimar Germany, working with and influencing important figures of the Bauhaus and  movements during his stay. In his remaining years he brought significant innovation and change to typography, exhibition design, photomontage, and book design, producing critically respected works and winning international acclaim for his exhibition design. This continued until his deathbed, where in 1941 he produced one of his last works – a Soviet propaganda poster rallying the people to construct more tanks for the fight against Nazi Germany. In 2014, the heirs of the artist, in collaboration with Van Abbemuseum and leading worldwide scholars on the subject, established the Lissitzky Foundation in order to preserve the artist's legacy and to prepare a catalogue raisonné of the artist's oeuvre.

Early years

During his childhood, he lived and studied in the city of Vitebsk, now part of Belarus, and later spent 10 years in Smolensk living with his grandparents and attending the Smolensk Grammar School, spending summer vacations in Vitebsk. Always expressing an interest and talent in drawing, he started to receive instruction at 13 from Yehuda Pen, a local Jewish artist, and by the time he was 15 was teaching students himself. In 1909, he applied to an art academy in Saint Petersburg, but was rejected. While he passed the entrance exam and was qualified, the law under the Tsarist regime only allowed a limited number of Jewish students to attend Russian schools and universities.

Like many other Jews then living in the Russian Empire, Lissitzky went to study in Germany. He left in 1909 to study architectural engineering at the Technische Hochschule in Darmstadt, Germany. During the summer of 1912, Lissitzky, in his own words, "wandered through Europe", spending time in Paris and covering  on foot in Italy, teaching himself about fine art and sketching architecture and landscapes that interested him. His interest in ancient Jewish culture had originated during the contacts with a Paris-based group of Russian Jews led by sculptor Ossip Zadkine, a lifetime friend of Lissitzky since early childhood, who exposed Lissitzky to conflicts between different groups within the diaspora. Also in 1912 some of his pieces were included for the first time in an exhibit by the St. Petersburg Artists Union; a notable first step. He remained in Germany until the outbreak of World War I, when he was forced to return home through Switzerland and the Balkans, along with many of his countrymen, including other expatriate artists born in the former Russian Empire, such as Wassily Kandinsky and Marc Chagall.

Upon his return to Moscow, Lissitzky attended the Polytechnic Institute of Riga, which had been evacuated to Moscow because of the war, and worked for the architectural firms of Boris Velikovsky and Roman Klein.  During this work, he took an active and passionate interest in Jewish culture which, after the downfall of the openly antisemitic Tsarist regime, was experiencing a renaissance. The new Provisional Government repealed a decree that prohibited the printing of Hebrew letters and that barred Jews from citizenship. Thus Lissitzky soon devoted himself to Jewish art, exhibiting works by local Jewish artists, traveling together with Issachar Ber Ryback to Mahilyow to study the traditional architecture and ornaments of old synagogues (especially the Cold Synagogue; in 1923 he published an article in Berlin Jewish journal Milgroim about the art he saw there), and illustrating many Yiddish children's books. These books were Lissitzky's first major foray in book design, a field that he would greatly influence over the course of his career.

His first designs appeared in the 1917 book, Sihas hulin: Eyne fun di geshikhten (An Everyday Conversation), where he incorporated Hebrew letters with a distinctly art nouveau flair. His next book was a visual retelling of the traditional Jewish Passover song Had gadya (One Goat), in which Lissitzky showcased a typographic device that he would often return to in later designs. In the book, he integrated letters with images through a system that matched the color of the characters in the story with the word referring to them. In the designs for the final page, Lissitzky depicts the mighty "hand of God" slaying the angel of death, who wears the tsar's crown. This representation links the redemption of the Jews with the victory of the Bolsheviks in the Russian Revolution. An alternative view asserts that the artist was wary of Bolshevik internationalization, leading to destruction of traditional Jewish culture. Visual representations of the hand of God would recur in numerous pieces throughout his entire career, most notably with his 1924 photomontage self-portrait The Constructor, which prominently featured the hand.

Avant-garde

Suprematism

In May 1919, upon receiving an invitation from fellow Jewish artist Marc Chagall, Lissitzky returned to Vitebsk to teach graphic arts, printing, and architecture at the newly formed People's Art School – a school that Chagall created after being appointed Commissioner of Artistic Affairs for Vitebsk in 1918. Lissitzky was engaged in designing and printing propaganda posters; later, he preferred to keep quiet about this period, probably because one of main subjects of these posters was the exile Leon Trotsky. The quantity of these posters is sufficient to regard them as a separate genre in the artist's output.

Chagall also invited other Russian artists, most notably the painter and art theoretician Kazimir Malevich and Lissitzky's former teacher, Yehuda Pen. However, it was not until October 1919 when Lissitzky, then on an errand in Moscow, persuaded Malevich to relocate to Vitebsk. The move coincided with the opening of the first art exhibition in Vitebsk directed by Chagall. Malevich would bring with him a wealth of new ideas, most of which inspired Lissitzky but clashed with local public and professionals who favored figurative art and with Chagall himself. After going through impressionism, primitivism, and cubism, Malevich began developing and advocating his ideas on suprematism aggressively. In development since 1915, suprematism rejected the imitation of natural shapes and focused more on the creation of distinct, geometric forms. He replaced the classic teaching program with his own and disseminated his suprematist theories and techniques school-wide. Chagall advocated more classical ideals and Lissitzky, still loyal to Chagall, became torn between two opposing artistic paths. Lissitzky ultimately favoured Malevich's suprematism and broke away from traditional Jewish art. Chagall left the school shortly thereafter.

At this point Lissitzky subscribed fully to suprematism and, under the guidance of Malevich, helped further develop the movement. In 1919–1920 Lissitzky was a head of Architectural department at the People's Art School where with his students, primarily Lazar Khidekel, he was working on transition from plane to volumetric suprematism. Lissitzky designed On the New System of Art by Malevich, who responded in December 1919: "Lazar Markovich, I salute you on the publication of this little book". Perhaps the most famous work by Lissitzky from the same period was the 1919 propaganda poster "Beat the Whites with the Red Wedge". Russia was going through a civil war at the time, which was mainly fought between the "Reds" (communists, socialists and revolutionaries) and the "Whites" (monarchists, conservatives, liberals and other socialists who opposed the Bolshevik Revolution). The image of the red wedge shattering the white form, simple as it was, communicated a powerful message that left no doubt in the viewer's mind of its intention. The piece is often seen as alluding to the similar shapes used on military maps and, along with its political symbolism, was one of Lissitzky's first major steps away from Malevich's non-objective suprematism into a style his own. He stated: "The artist constructs a new symbol with his brush. This symbol is not a recognizable form of anything that is already finished, already made, or already existent in the world – it is a symbol of a new world, which is being built upon and which exists by the way of the people."

On 17 January 1920, Malevich and Lissitzky co-founded the short-lived Molposnovis (Young followers of a new art), a proto-suprematist association of students, professors, and other artists. After a brief and stormy dispute between "old" and "young" generations, and two rounds of renaming, the group reemerged as UNOVIS (Exponents of the new art) in February. Under the leadership of Malevich the group worked on a "suprematist ballet", choreographed by Nina Kogan and on the remake of a 1913 futurist opera Victory Over the Sun by Mikhail Matyushin and Aleksei Kruchenykh. Lissitzky and the entire group chose to share credit and responsibility for the works produced within the group, signing most pieces with a black square. This was partly a homage to a similar piece by their leader, Malevich, and a symbolic embrace of the Communist ideal. This would become the de facto seal of UNOVIS that took the place of individual names or initials. Black squares worn by members as chest badges and cufflinks also resembled the ritual tefillin and thus were no strange symbol in Vitebsk shtetl.

The group, which disbanded in 1922, would be pivotal in the dissemination of suprematist ideology in Russia and abroad and launch Lissitzky's status as one of the leading figures in the avant garde. Incidentally, the earliest appearance of the signature Lissitzky emerged in the handmade UNOVIS Miscellany, issued in two copies in March–April 1920, and containing his manifesto on book art: "the book enters the skull through the eye not the ear therefore the pathways the waves move at much greater speed and with more intensity. if i (sic) can only sing through my mouth with a book i (sic) can show myself in various guises."

Proun

During this period Lissitzky proceeded to develop a suprematist style of his own, a series of abstract, geometric paintings which he called Proun (pronounced "pro-oon"). Later, Lissitzky defined them ambiguously as "the station where one changes from painting to architecture."

Proun was essentially Lissitzky's exploration of the visual language of suprematism with spatial elements, utilizing shifting axes and multiple perspectives; both uncommon ideas in suprematism. Suprematism at the time was conducted almost exclusively in flat, 2D forms and shapes, and Lissitzky, with a taste for architecture and other 3D concepts, tried to expand suprematism beyond this. His Proun works spanned over a half a decade and evolved from straightforward paintings and lithographs into fully three-dimensional installations. They would also lay the foundation for his later experiments in architecture and exhibition design. While the paintings were artistic in their own right, their use as a staging ground for his early architectonic ideas was significant. In these works, the basic elements of architecture – volume, mass, color, space and rhythm – were subjected to a fresh formulation in relation to the new suprematist ideals. Through his Prouns, utopian models for a new and better world were developed. This approach, in which the artist creates art with socially defined purpose, could aptly be summarized with his edict "" – "task oriented creation."

Jewish themes and symbols also sometimes made appearances in his Prounen, usually with Lissitzky using Hebrew letters as part of the typography or visual code. For the cover of the 1922 book  (Four Billy Goats; cover), he shows an arrangement of Hebrew letters as architectural elements in a dynamic design that mirrors his contemporary Proun typography.

Return to Germany

In 1921, roughly concurrent with the demise of UNOVIS, suprematism was beginning to fracture into two ideologically adverse halves, one favoring Utopian, spiritual art and the other a more utilitarian art that served society. Lissitzky was fully aligned with neither and left Vitebsk in 1921. He took a job as a cultural representative of Russia and moved to Berlin where he was to establish contacts between Russian and German artists. There he also took up work as a writer and designer for international magazines and journals while helping to promote the avant-garde through various gallery shows. He started the very short-lived but impressive periodical Veshch-Gegenstand Objekt with Russian-Jewish writer Ilya Ehrenburg. This was intended to display contemporary Russian art to Western Europe. It was a wide-ranging pan-arts publication, mainly focusing on new suprematist and constructivist works, and was published in German, French and Russian. In the first issue, Lissitzky wrote:

We consider the triumph of the constructive method to be essential for our present. We find it not only in the new economy and in the development of the industry, but also in the psychology of our contemporaries of art. Veshch will champion constructive art, whose mission is not, after all, to embellish life, but to organize it.

During his stay Lissitzky also developed his career as a graphic designer with some historically important works such as the books Dlia Golossa (For the Voice), a collection of poems from Vladimir Mayakovsky, and Die Kunstismen (The Artisms) together with Jean Arp. In Berlin he also met and befriended many other artists, most notably Kurt Schwitters, László Moholy-Nagy, and Theo van Doesburg. Together with Schwitters and van Doesburg, Lissitzky presented the idea of an international artistic movement under the guidelines of constructivism while also working with Kurt Schwitters on the issue Nasci (Nature) of the periodical Merz, and continuing to illustrate children's books. The year after the publication of his first Proun series in Moscow in 1921, Schwitters introduced Lissitzky to the Hanover gallery kestnergesellschaft, where he held his first solo exhibition. The second Proun series, printed in Hanover in 1923, was a success, utilizing new printing techniques. Later on, he met Sophie Küppers, who was the widow of Paul Küppers, an art director of the kestnergesellschaft at which Lissitzky was showing, and whom he would marry in 1927.

Horizontal skyscrapers
In 1923–1925, Lissitzky proposed and developed the idea of horizontal skyscrapers (Wolkenbügel, "cloud-hangers",  "sky-hangers" or "sky-hooks"). A series of eight such structures was intended to mark the major intersections of the Boulevard Ring in Moscow. Each Wolkenbügel was a flat three-story, 180-meter-wide L-shaped slab raised 50 meters above street level. It rested on three pylons (10×16×50 meters each), placed on three different street corners. One pylon extended underground, doubling as the staircase into a proposed subway station; two others provided shelter for ground-level tram stations.

Lissitzky argued that as long as humans cannot fly, moving horizontally is natural and moving vertically is not. Thus, where there is not sufficient land for construction, a new plane created in the air at medium altitude should be preferred to an American-style tower. These buildings, according to Lissitzky, also provided superior insulation and ventilation for their inhabitants.

Lissitzky, aware of severe mismatch between his ideas and the existing urban landscape, experimented with different configurations of the horizontal surface and height-to-width ratios so that the structure appeared balanced visually ("spatial balance is in the contrast of vertical and horizontal tensions"). The raised platform was shaped in a way that each of its four facets looked distinctly different. Each tower faced the Kremlin with the same facet, providing a pointing arrow to pedestrians on the streets. All eight buildings were planned identically, so Lissitzky proposed color-coding them for easier orientation.

After some time of creating "paper architecture" projects such as the Wolkenbügels he was hired to design an actual building in Moscow. Located at  17, 1st Samotechny Lane, it is Lissitzky's sole tangible work of architecture. It was commissioned in 1932 by Ogonyok magazine to be used as a print shop. In June 2007 the independent Russky Avangard foundation filed a request to list the building on the heritage register. In September 2007 the city commission (Moskomnasledie) approved the request and passed it to the city government for a final approval, which did not happen. In October 2008, the abandoned building was badly damaged by fire.

Exhibitions of the 1920s
After two years of intensive work Lissitzky was taken ill with acute pneumonia in October 1923. A few weeks later he was diagnosed with pulmonary tuberculosis; in February 1924 he relocated to a Swiss sanatorium near Locarno. He kept very busy during his stay, working on advertisement designs for Pelikan Industries (who in turn paid for his treatment), translating articles written by Malevich into German, and experimenting heavily in typographic design and photography. He all but stopped his Proun works and became increasingly active in architecture and propaganda designs.

In June 1926, Lissitzky left the country again, this time for a brief stay in Germany and the Netherlands. In his autobiography (written in June 1941, and later edited and released by his wife), Lissitzky wrote, "1926. My most important work as an artist begins: the creation of exhibitions."

In 1926, Lissitzky joined Nikolai Ladovsky's Association of New Architects (ASNOVA) and designed the only issue of the association's journal Izvestiia ASNOVA (News of ASNOVA) in 1926.

Back in the USSR, Lissitzky designed displays for the official Soviet pavilions at the international exhibitions of the period, up to the 1939 New York World's Fair. One of his most notable exhibits was the All-Union Polygraphic Exhibit in Moscow in August–October 1927, where Lissitzky headed the design team for "photography and photomechanics" (i.e. photomontage) artists and the installation crew. His work was perceived as radically new, especially when juxtaposed with the classicist designs of Vladimir Favorsky (head of the book art section of the same exhibition) and of the foreign exhibits.

In the beginning of 1928, Lissitzky visited Cologne in preparation for the 1928 Pressa Show scheduled for April–May 1928. The state delegated Lissitzky to supervise the Soviet program; instead of building their own pavilion, the Soviets rented the existing central pavilion, the largest building on the fairground. To make full use of it, the Soviet program designed by Lissitsky revolved around the theme of a film show, with nearly continuous presentation of the new feature films, propagandist newsreels and early animation, on multiple screens inside the pavilion and on the open-air screens. His work was praised for near absence of paper exhibits; "everything moves, rotates, everything is energized". Lissitzky also designed and managed on site less demanding exhibitions like the 1930 Hygiene show in Dresden.

Along with pavilion design, Lissitzky began experimenting with print media again. His work with book and periodical design was perhaps some of his most accomplished and influential. He launched radical innovations in typography and photomontage, two fields in which he was particularly adept. He even designed a photomontage birth announcement in 1930 for his recently born son, Jen. The image itself is seen as being another personal endorsement of the Soviet Union, as it superimposed an image of the infant Jen over a factory chimney, linking Jen's future with his country's industrial progress. Around this time, Lissitzky's interest in book design escalated. In his remaining years, some of his most challenging and innovative works in this field would develop. In discussing his vision of the book, he wrote:

In contrast to the old monumental art [the book] itself goes to the people, and does not stand like a cathedral in one place waiting for someone to approach ... [The book is the] monument of the future.

He perceived books as permanent objects that were invested with power. This power was unique in that it could transmit ideas to people of different times, cultures, and interests, and do so in ways other art forms could not. This ambition laced all of his work, particularly in his later years. Lissitzky was devoted to the idea of creating art with power and purpose, art that could invoke change.

Later years
In 1932, Stalin closed down independent artists' unions; former avant-garde artists had to adapt to the new climate or risk being officially criticised or even blacklisted. Lissitzky retained his reputation as the master of exhibition art and management into the late 1930s. His tuberculosis gradually reduced his physical abilities, and he was becoming more and more dependent on his wife in actual completion of his work.

In 1937, Lissitzky served as the lead decorator for the upcoming All-Union Agricultural Exhibition, reporting to the master planner Vyacheslav Oltarzhevsky but largely independent and highly critical of him. The project was plagued by delays and political interventions. By the end of 1937 the "apparent simplicity" of Lissitzky's artwork aroused the concerns of the political supervisors, and Lissitzky responded: "The simpler the shape, the finer precision and quality of execution required... yet until now [the working crews] are instructed by the foremen (Oltarzhevsky and Korostashevsky), not the authors" (i.e. Vladimir Shchuko, author of the Central Pavilion, and Lissitzky himself). His artwork, as described in 1937 proposals, completely departed from the modernist art of the 1920s in favor of socialist realism. The iconic statue of Stalin in front of the central pavilion was proposed by Lissitzky personally: "this will give the square its head and its face".

In June 1938, he was only one of seventeen professionals and managers responsible for the Central Pavilion; in October 1938, he shared the responsibility for its Main Hall decoration with Vladimir Akhmetyev. He simultaneously worked on the decoration of the Soviet pavilion for the 1939 New York World's Fair; the June 1938 commission considered Lissitzky's work along with nineteen other proposals and eventually rejected it.

Lissitzky's work on the USSR in Construction magazine took his experimentation and innovation with book design to an extreme. In issue #2 he included multiple fold-out pages, presented in concert with other folded pages that together produced design combinations and a narrative structure that was completely original. Each issue focused on a particular issue of the time – a new dam being built, constitutional reforms, Red Army progress and so on. In 1941, his tuberculosis worsened, but he continued to produce works, one of his last being a propaganda poster for Russia's efforts in World War II, titled "Davaite pobolshe tankov!" (Give us more tanks!). He died on 30 December 1941, in Moscow.

Notes

References

 Berkovich, Gary. Reclaiming a History. Jewish Architects in Imperial Russia and the USSR. Volume 2. Soviet Avant-garde: 1917–1933. Weimar und Rostock: Grunberg Verlag. 2021. P. 103. 

 Shishanov V.A. Vitebsk Museum of Modern Art: a history of creation and a collection. 1918-1941. - Minsk: Medisont, 2007. - 144 p. 

 El Lissitzky. Wolkenbügel 1924-1925. Publisher= Editorial Rueda, Madrid, 2005

External links

 
Ibiblio.org – Image collection of some of his most famous works
MoMA – Flash-navigable exploration of USSR im bau and Dlia Golossa (click on "Reading Room" link)
The Roland Collection of Films & Videos on Art – Free streaming download of an entire 88-minute documentary, El Lissitzky, by Leo Lorez
A Factory Discography – Factory Records catalog by Dennis Remmer.
Factory Benelux Discography – Factory Benelux section of the above website (scroll to FBN 24 to see The Wake).
FAC 101 to FAC 150 – Portion of Remmer's Factory catalog that contains FACT 130.
The full text of NASCI (Merz No. 8/9, Hanover, April–July 1924).
Van Abbemuseum Eindhoven image collection of El Lissizky
MT Abraham Foundation El Lissizky at the MT Abraham Collection
Valeri Shishanov. VITEBSK’ BUDETLANE
Catalogue listing for Swann Galleries auction of record-setting poster by Lissitzky.
El Lissitzky. Suprematic tale about two squares
 

1890 births
1941 deaths
People from Pochinok
People from Yelninsky Uyezd
Russian Jews
Soviet Jews
Abstract painters
Constructivist architects
Russian graphic designers
Jewish painters
Jewish socialists
Russian avant-garde
Russian watercolorists
Russian architects
Soviet artists
Constructivism (art)
20th-century Russian painters
Russian male painters
Technische Universität Darmstadt alumni
Academic staff of Vkhutemas
Congrès International d'Architecture Moderne members
20th-century deaths from tuberculosis
Tuberculosis deaths in the Soviet Union
Tuberculosis deaths in Russia